The Serpent Servant is the second studio album by American Christian deathcore band Impending Doom. They worked with the metalcore band As I Lay Dying vocalist Tim Lambesis and his production partner Daniel Castleman to record the album. The album was released in the US on March 31, 2009, from Facedown Records and on March 30, 2009, through Siege of Amida Records.

The album reached No. 144 on the Billboard 200 and No. 3 on the Heatseekers Albums chart. It sold 4,300 copies in its first week of release. It is the last album by the band to feature lead guitarist Manny Contreras before he rejoined the band in 2012, the first to feature rhythm guitarist Cory Johnson (ex-Sleeping Giant), and the only album to feature drummer Chad Blackwell.

Track listing

Personnel
Impending Doom
 Brook Reeves – vocals
 Manny Contreras – lead guitar
 Cory Johnson – rhythm guitar
 David Sittig – bass
 Chad Blackwell – drums

Production
 Tim Lambesis – production
 Daniel Castleman – production, engineering
 Kelly "Carnage" Cairns – engineering
 Zeuss – engineering, mixing, mastering
 Shawn Carrano – management
 Colin Marks – artwork

References

2009 albums
Facedown Records albums
Impending Doom albums